Patrick Wang is an American writer, economist, director, and actor. His first feature film, the acclaimed hit indie film In the Family, was released in 2011. He later directed the acclaimed two-part indie film A Bread Factory in 2018.

Early life and education
Wang is a second-generation Taiwanese American. He was raised in Sugar Land, Texas, a suburb of Houston. He graduated from the Massachusetts Institute of Technology with a degree in economics and a concentration in music and theater arts.

Career
As an economist, Wang has studied energy policy, game theory, and income inequality at the Federal Reserve Bank, the Harvard School of Public Health, and other organizations.

Film
His feature film directorial debut In The Family, which he wrote, directed, produced, and starred in, was nominated for a "Best First Feature" Independent Spirit Award, and received positive reviews from Roger Ebert, The New York Times, the Los Angeles Times, the Chicago Reader, Time Out Chicago, NOW Magazine, and was featured on several "Best of 2011" film lists. The film also won Best Narrative Feature awards at the San Diego Asian Film Festival, the Spokane International Film Festival, and the San Francisco International Asian American Film Festival, with Wang personally receiving awards at the festivals as well. For the film, Wang also was named by Filmmaker Magazine as one of the "25 New Faces of Independent Film".

His second feature film that he wrote and directed is entitled The Grief of Others (2015), based on the 2011 novel of the same name by Leah Hager Cohen. The film premiered at the 2015 South by Southwest Film Festival, and was released theatrically throughout France in August 2015 by ED Distribution under the title, Les Secrets des Autres.

His third feature, which was released in two parts, was A Bread Factory (2018), about a community arts center in the fictional town of Checkford, New York. In connection with a retrospective of Wang's films in the United Kingdom and Ireland, Phil Hoad in the Guardian wrote that "Wang’s films, seen together, showcase a civically minded vision that demands attention."

Wang has previously acted in, written, and produced short films such as Little Mary and Surveillances, and also acted in short films including Rushing River, Inherent Darkness and Enlightenment, and Headspace.

Theater
As a theater director, Wang has also specialized in the direction of classical verse drama. He directed the world premiere of Dianne Arnson Svarlien's translation of Medea.

He has also directed musicals, including Surviving the Nian. Wang has taught and directed productions at the Stella Adler Studio and the Neighborhood Playhouse.

He has authored a book of 75 original short monologue plays entitled The Monologue Plays.

References

External links

Angry Asian Man: Patrick Wang's In The Family Opens in the Quad on Nov. 4
SDAFF Interview with Patrick Wang

Living people
American male film actors
American film directors of Taiwanese descent
American male writers
American people of Chinese descent
Year of birth missing (living people)